Onslaught is a video game that was released by Hewson in 1989 for the Amiga and subsequently ported to the Atari ST, MS-DOS, and Mega Drive. The game is a fantasy-themed platform game with an eerie soundtrack and graphic violence.

Onslaught was re-released for iOS in December 2008 and for the Xbox 360 in January 2009 for the Xbox 360 via Xbox Live.

Plot

Gameplay
Gameplay takes place in three sections. First, a territory to attack is selected from the campaign screen; next the player is taken to the territory, where he battles through hordes of themed aggressors on a side-scrolling landscape to reach a castle, which he must also conquer; finally the player faces the master of the castle – a wizard with four spell-casting tentacle arms – whom he must defeat by firing magic at him whilst avoiding the spells that the wizard fires back. On defeating the master of the castle the player wins the territory and returns to the campaign screen to select the next territory to attack.

Reception
Onslaught received mixed reviews on its release. Whilst The Games Machine gave it a score of 95% and rated it a "Top Game" and Zzap! scored it 85%, Your Amiga gave it 54%, and Sweden's Datormagazin awarded it just 3/10. Mega placed the game at #8 in their list of the 10 Worst Mega Drive Games of All Time.

References

External links
 Onslaught at the Hall of Light Database of Amiga Games
 

1989 video games
Amiga games
Atari ST games
DOS games
Hewson Consultants games
IOS games
Sega Genesis games
Single-player video games
Video games developed in the United Kingdom
Video games set in castles
Xbox 360 games
Arc Developments games